Sir Dinadan (also written Dinadam, Dinadano, Dinaden, Dinadem, Dinadeira, Divdan, Dynadan, Dynadam) is a Cornish knight of the Round Table in the Arthurian legend's chivalric romance tradition of the Prose Tristan and its adaptations, including a part of Le Morte d'Arthur. Best known for his humor and pragmatism, he is a close friend of the protagonist Tristan. Dinadan is subject of several often comedic episodes, until his murder by Mordred and Agravain.

Medieval literature 

Dinadan is a knight of Cornwall and a son of Bruenor senior (the Good Knight Without Fear). His brothers are fellow Round Table knights Breunor le Noir and Daniel. Unlike most other knights in Arthurian romance, the practically-minded Dinadan prefers to avoid fights and considers courtly love a waste of time, though he is a brave fighter when he needs to be.

Like Palamedes and Lamorak, Dinadan was an invention of the 13th-century Prose Tristan (a variant of the legend of Tristan and Iseult). He also appeared in its later retellings, including the Post-Vulgate Cycle and Thomas Malory's popular Le Morte d'Arthur (in "The Book of Sir Tristan"), as well as in some less-known romances, such as Escanor, where his strong  distrust of women is a theme of comedy, and some variants of Les Prophéties de Merlin.

Le Morte d'Arthur

Malory's Dinadan is known for his cynical humor and joking nature, and his mockery of chivalry. While he is visiting the court of Cornwall seeking his friend, the young hero Tristan (Tristram), Dinadan has supper with the young Queen Iseult (La Beale Isoud) where he reveals that he has, by his own desire, no lady-love or paramour in whose name to do great deeds. Dinadan is also often portrayed as the wittiest of all of Arthur's knights, and a source and target of practical jokes. In Le Morte d'Arthur, he is one of the few knights to recognize his armored fellows from more than just their shields; in one particular instance, Tristan does not recognize his king until Dinadan tells him. In one notable exploit, he writes an insulting lai ballad about King Mark and sends a troubadour to play it at Mark's court. In another episode, he loses a joust when Lancelot catches him off guard by wearing a dress over his armor, and Lancelot then puts the dress on his unconscious opponent.

As summarized by to Joyce Coleman, "Margaret Schlauch hails the 'courtly realism' of Sir Thomas Malory's Le Morte d'Arthur and, in particular, 'the comically realistic Sir Dinadan', whose jokes about his fear of jousting have his listeners laughing so hard they can barely keep their seats. 'Sir Dinadan, the realist' [Elizabeth Edwards], the 'rational moralist' ruled by a 'pragmatic creed' [Donald Hoffman], remains a standard figure of Malorian analysis." However, some like Eugène Vinaver and Harold Livermore regard the humor of Malory's Dinadan as inferior to that in his French original sources, in which Dinadan's jokes are more offensive and subversive, targeting even the otherwise sacred subject of religion. 

In Le Morte d'Arthur, following the Prose Tristan narrative, Dinadan tragically and violently meets his end when he returns from Cornwall, hoping to persuade King Arthur to reverse his ruling which had again set Mark on the throne. However Dinadan, still wounded from his fight against the evil knight Brehu the Merciless, is ambushed and murdered by two other Knights of the Round Table, the treacherous half-brothers Mordred and Agravain, who hated him due to his closeness to their enemy Lamorak from the rival clan of King Pellinore. Lancelot's half-brother Hector de Maris finds Dinadan mortally wounded and takes him to Camelot, where he dies in Lancelot's arms.

La Tavola Ritonda
In La Tavola Ritonda, a late medieval Italian rewrite of the Prose Tristan, Dinadan (Dinadano) himself attempts to murder the captured Mark (Marco) in revenge for the death of his dear friend Tristan (Tristano), and Brehu the Merciless (Breus sanz Pietà) is actually his cousin. This version of Dinadan is characterized differently, as he is a violent misogynist who hates even Tristan's beloved Iseult (Isotta) and openly insults her as a "whore". The only time Dinadan does fall in love with a woman is his brief affair with the evil Losanna of the Ancient Tower (Losanna della Torre Antica), which even causes him to turn against Tristan who fights to save Losanna's rival Tessina (whom Dinadan calls a "whore" too). Dinadan's usually obsessively hostile attitude towards women earns him much friendly mockery from Tristan. This includes a comical episode where, after Dinadan refuses to marry a daughter of Espinogres (here portrayed as a king, but in Malory's version a knight who is a companion of Tristan and Dinadan), Tristan enters Dinadan's room at night pretending to be her madly in love with him.

Modern fiction 
Dinadan's modern appearances include the stage version and film adaptation of the musical Camelot, portrayed by John Cullum, Christopher Sieber, and (in the film) Anthony Rogers. He is also the eponymous protagonist of Gerald Morris' 2003 novel The Ballad of Sir Dinadan, as well as subject of the chapter "Sir Dinadan the Humorist" in Mark Twain's 1890 A Connecticut Yankee in King Arthur's Court.

See also
Dagonet, King Arthur's court jester
Sancho Panza

References

External links
Dinadan at The Camelot Project
Dinadan at Nighbringer.se

Fictional pranksters
Knights of the Round Table